Part Chimp are an English rock band from Camberwell, London, England, that were formed by Tim Cedar, Jon Hamilton and Nick Prior in 2000.  Their current line-up is Tim (vocals and guitar), Jon (drums), Joe McLaughlin (bass), Robin Freeman (bass), and Iain Hinchliffe (guitar).

They play rock music with elements of noise. Both in recordings and live performances, Part Chimp have a reputation for sounding extremely loud. Their records have been released in the UK by Rock Action Records, in Europe and Japan by Play It Again Sam, and in the US by Monitor records.

History
Tim Cedar and Jon Hamilton had previously played together in Ligament.  Nick Prior (bass), formerly of Scarfo, joined Ligament for their last tour. When Ligament split, the threesome played one show as Part Chimp in late 2000, before adding Iain Hinchliffe on guitar. Nick Prior left the band in February 2004 and was replaced by Joe McLaughlin. In 2008, Tracy Bellaries (ex-Ikara Colt) joined on bass, playing on the Thriller record before leaving in early 2010. After a brief band hiatus, Joe McLaughlin rejoined and played on the Iv lp, Cheap Thriller and the 2021 release Drool alongside touring bassist Robin Freeman.

Band
Tim Cedar (vocals and guitar) has also played with Ligament, Penthouse (aka Fifty Tons of Black Terror), Sophia, The Loveblobs, Fury Things, Action Swingers, Scarfo, Cass McCombs, Iron Kat, Beardhead, Hey Colossus, Sex Swing, Beef Wellington, and Westminster Brown. He also recorded and produced many other bands at Dropout Studio in Camberwell, which closed down in 2018.
Jon Hamilton (drums) (aka Hamilton Industry aka Drumm Chimp) has also played with Ligament, Our Lady of Miracles/Vertigo Angels, Tabitha Zu, Shit & Shine, and Th' Faith Healers, and releases solo records as Drumm Chimp.
Iain Hinchliffe (guitar) has also played with The Schoolhouse, Foil, and Sawyer.
Joe McLaughlin (bass) also plays with The Left Hand, Kling Klang, The International, and Mono-Poly.
Robin Freeman (bass, touring) also plays with Hag.

Cedar and Hamilton also play live and record as Die Munch Machine.

Discography

Albums
Chart Pimp (2003, 12" LP & CD) - Rock Action Records, Monitor, Play It Again Sam
I Am Come (2005, 12" LP, CD & Japan only 2xCD) - Rock Action Records, Monitor & Play It Again Sam
Cup (2007, North American only compilation CD) - Monitor Records
Thriller (2009, 12" LP & CD) - Rock Action Records, Play It Again Sam
Reduce To Clear (2009, Live Tour CD) - Cock Ration Records
 Iv (2017, 12" LP & CD) - Rock Action Records
 Cheap Thriller (2018) - Chart Pimp
 Drool (2021) - Wrong Speed Recordings
 Early Chimp (2022) - Chart Pimp

Singles
"Bring Back the Sound", 7" & CD single - Rock Action Records
"War Machine", 7" & CD single - Rock Action Records
"New Cross", CD single - Rock Action Records
"Big Bird" / "You Decide", 7" single - Gringo Records

Splits and compilations
Part Chimp & Grey Hairs (Split 7" single), God Unknown
Part Chimp & Joeyfat (Split 7" single), Awkward Silence Recordings
Part Chimp & Todd (Split 7" single), Noisestar
 A 10 inch of Monstrous Proportions (10", 2006), Rock Action Records, Gringo Records, Southern, Jonson Family - features one songs by Part Chimp, Todd, Lords, & Hey Colossus 
Torche / Part Chimp (Split 12" single), Chunklet Industries
Up Yours! Punks Not Dead (Mojo Magazine Compilation CD), Mojo
Rock Sound July 2005 CD (Rock Sound Magazine Compilation CD), Rock Sound
Rock Action Presents.. (Compilation CD), Rock Action Records
A Rock Action Sampler (Compilation CD), Plan B Magazine
Buffalo Bar - Sound Issues (Compilation CD), Buffalo Bar
Silver Rock SR50 (Compilation CD), Silver Rocket
Sonic Mook Experiment 3:Hot Shit (Compilation CD), Blast First/Mute
Un40rmulated (Compilation CD), Unlabel
S***R Greatest Hits Volume 1 (Compilation CD), SWEAR Shoes
Wrongpop Presents... A Charity Album In Aid Of CheckEmLads (Compilation Download), Bandcamp
Baba Yaga's Hut Compilation 2020 (Compilation Download), Bandcamp

Radio sessions
Peel Session 16 October 2002
Resonance FM GlassShrimp session 2003
 Peel Session Live Set from ATP recorded 26 March broadcast 30 March 2004
One Music Session 23 August 2005
XFM session 20 September 2005
One World: "The White Album Covers Show - A Tribute to John Lennon" 5 December 2005
XFM session September/October 2009
Marc Riley BBC Radio 6 Music Session 12 July 2011
Marc Riley BBC Radio 6 Music Session 17 May 2017
Radio X John Kennedy's X-Posure Session 18 April 2018

References

External links
Part Chimp's website

English rock music groups
Musical groups from London
Musical groups established in 2000
English noise rock groups
English grunge groups
English garage rock groups
Sludge metal musical groups
British alternative metal musical groups
British post-grunge groups
English stoner rock musical groups
English indie rock groups
Rock Action Records artists
PIAS Recordings artists